The 1916 Geneva Covenanters football team was an American football team that represented Geneva College as an independent during the 1916 college football season. Led by C. Brainerd Metheny in his fourth and final year ad head coach, the team compiled a record of 2–5–2.

Schedule

References

Geneva
Geneva Golden Tornadoes football seasons
Geneva Covenanters football